Wola Przedborska  is a village in the administrative district of Gmina Przedbórz, within Radomsko County, Łódź Voivodeship, in central Poland.

The village has a population of 298.

References

Wola Przedborska